The Kulmbach Brewery Corporation (German: Kulmbacher Brauerei AG) was founded in 1895 under the name Reichelbräu in Kulmbach, a city in Upper Franconia, Bavaria, Germany.

History 
The success of the brewery started with the export of Kulmbach beer to Central, East and North Germany.

Since 1980 the Kulmbach Brewery Corporation has been noticed for its steady expansions. In 1980 and 1984 the company merged with the companies Sandlerbräu and Mönchshof-Bräu GmbH and two more brands of beer was added to the product line.

In 1986, the Schörghuber Unternehmungsgruppe took over 49,9% of the share capital. The expansions continued in the 1990s with the take-overs of the companies Sternquell Brauerei, Plauen, the Braustolz Brauerei in Chemnitz, Eku as well as a majority of the stock in the Bad Brambacher mineral spring. Since 1996 the brands EKU, Reichel, Sandler and Mönchshof are under the roof of the Kulmbach Brewery Corporation. In 2002, the beverage production exceeded three million hektolitres.

Statistics 
(As of 30 June 2005)

Employees:  1074
Production: 1.730.000 hl
Revenue:    114.600.000 €

Exchange:         Munich, Frankfurt
Number of shares: 3.360.000

Share owners
Brau Holding International GmbH + Co. KGaA (Munich): 62,66%
Ireks GmbH (Kulmbach):                   26%
Other shareholders:                                 11,4%

Beers 

 Kulmbacher Edelherb
 Kulmbacher Gold
 Kulmbacher Eisbock
 Kulmbacher Lager
 Kulmbacher Festbier
 Kulmbacher Feinmild
 Mönchshof Kellerbier
 Mönchshof Lager
 Mönchshof Landbier
 Mönchshof Original
 Mönchshof Schwarzbier
 Mönchshof Bockbier
 Mönchshof Weihnachtsbier
 Mönchshof Museumsbier
 Mönchshof Festbier
 EKU Pils
 EKU Hell
 EKU Export
 EKU Festbier
 EKU 28 (Starkbier)
 Kapuziner Weißbier
 Kapuziner Winterweizen

Trivia 
 The Kulmbach Brewery Corporation is the only German brewery that displays a coat of arms of a city in its trademarks. This was approved by the Kulmbach city council in 1926. Six years later the first Kulmbacher Edelherb was introduced to the German market, where it has been ever since.
 Since the 2006–07 season, Kulmbacher is the official beer of 1. FC Nürnberg.
 The company arranges a Kulmbach Beer Week in collaboration with the city of Kulmbach that has more than 100.000 visitors every year. The first beer week was in 1939, arranged not by the brewery but by the Kulmbach chamber of commerce.

External links 
 Homepage der Kulmbacher Brauerei AG
 Das Bayerische Brauereimuseum
 Die Kulmbacher Bierwoche
 

Beer and breweries in Bavaria
Breweries in Germany
Beer brands of Germany
Companies based in Bavaria
1895 establishments in Bavaria